Johann Michael Zächer (1649 – 30 September 1712) was an Austrian composer.

Zächer was born in Vienna. He was Domkapellmeister of St. Stephen's Cathedral, Vienna from 1679 and Kapellmeister to Eleonor Magdalene of Neuburg the dowager empress on the death of Leopold I, Holy Roman Emperor in 1705.

Works, editions and recordings
Die Heldenmüthige Judith in einem teutschen Oratorio (1704)
Vespers in Vienna. Pierre Cao

References

Austrian classical composers
Austrian Baroque composers
1649 births
1712 deaths
Musicians from Vienna
18th-century classical composers
18th-century Austrian male musicians
Austrian male classical composers